Qayalı or Kayaly may refer to:
Qayalı, Barda, Azerbaijan
Qayalı, Jalilabad, Azerbaijan
Qayalı, Qubadli, Azerbaijan